K. J. Hamida Khanam ( – 11 September 2015) was a Bangladeshi politician belonging to Bangladesh Nationalist Party. She was a member of the Jatiya Sangsad.

Biography
Hamida Khanam was elected as a member of the Jatiya Sangsad from Reserved Women's Seat-20 in the Fifth Jatiya Sangsad Election. She was also elected as a member of the Jatiya Sangsad from Reserved Women's Seat-20 in the Sixth General Election of Bangladesh.

Khaleda Khanam died on 11 September 2015 at Eden Multicare Hospital in Dhaka at the age of 75.

References

1940s births
2015 deaths
5th Jatiya Sangsad members
6th Jatiya Sangsad members
Bangladesh Nationalist Party politicians
Women members of the Jatiya Sangsad
20th-century Bangladeshi women politicians